Brigadier Reginald Eustace Hamilton Hudson (22 August 1904 – 26 May 1995) was a first-class cricketer based in India. A British soldier, Hudson played for the British Army cricket team and the Europeans. His highest score of 217 was made in 225 minutes against the RAF at The Oval in 1932. The following year he made 181 against the West Indies. His brother, Eric Hudson, also played first-class cricket.

References

External links

1904 births
1995 deaths
Indian cricketers
English cricketers
Europeans cricketers
British Army cricketers
Marylebone Cricket Club cricketers
Minor Counties cricketers
Devon cricketers
Gentlemen cricketers
Northern India cricketers
Combined Services cricketers
Indian Army cricketers
Companions of the Distinguished Service Order
British people in colonial India